The German rail network provides connections to each of its neighbouring countries, many of which are under the EuroCity classification. EuroCity services are part of the Intercity network - many EC services represented a couple of train pairs on an IC route extended across the border, while other routes are served primarily by EuroCity services. EuroCity services are generally locomotive-hauled, using Intercity rolling stock, either from Deutsche Bahn or one of the other countries along the route.

EuroCity services

Below is a list of current EuroCity services in Germany.

† Name no longer in use.

Intercity services that cross borders

A number of trains provide international connections, but are classed as Intercity rather than Eurocity. This may be because the routes were former InterRegio services, or they only travel a short distance over the border.

ICE international
The ICE network has grown since its introduction, and there are now services to Aarhus, Amsterdam, Brussels, Copenhagen, Interlaken, Paris, Vienna and Zurich. In addition, there are TGV and Thalys routes to Brussels, Paris and Marseille, as well as ÖBB's Railjet to Vienna and Budapest.

EuroCity Express
With the December 2017 schedule change, a new train service between Frankfurt am Main and Milano Centrale was introduced and branded by Deutsche Bahn (though neither by the Swiss nor the Italian railroads) as "EuroCity Express" with tickets put in the same price category as ICE tickets, unlike "regular" EuroCity trains which are in the same ticket category as IC.

Notes

See also
EuroCity
Intercity (Deutsche Bahn)

Gallery

External links
Fernbahn - train formations
Deutsche Bahn IC/EC Network

 
Passenger rail transport in Germany